"Don't Make a Beggar of Me" is a popular song recorded by Frank Sinatra on 2 April 1953, at his first recording session for Capitol Records, but not released until the CD reissue of his 1962 album, Point of No Return. The song was written by the former Tin Pan Alley tunesmith Al Sherman and arranged by Axel Stordahl.

References

Frank Sinatra songs
Songs written by Al Sherman
1953 songs